Body snatching is the secret removal of corpses from burial sites. A common purpose of body snatching, especially in the 19th century, was to sell the corpses for dissection or anatomy lectures in medical schools.

Damnatio memoriae Latin phrase meaning "condemnation of memory", indicating that a person is to be excluded from official accounts. 
Decanonization exclusion of a person's name from the list, catalog; the opposite of canonization.
Desecration of graves involves intentional acts of vandalism or destruction in places where humans are interred and includes grave sites and Grave markers.

Gibbeting is any instrument of public execution (including guillotine, executioner's block, impalement stake, hanging gallows, or related scaffold), but gibbeting refers to the use of a gallows-type structure from which the dead or dying bodies of criminals were hanged on public display to deter other existing or potential criminals.
Grave robbery  is the act of uncovering a grave, tomb or crypt to steal commodities.

Headhunting is the practice of hunting a human and collecting the severed head after killing the victim, although sometimes more portable body parts (such as ear, nose or scalp) are taken instead as trophies.
Human trophy collecting involves the acquisition of human body parts as trophy, usually as war trophy. Or as a status symbol of superior masculinity.  Psychopathic serial murderers' collection of their victims' body parts have also been described as a form of trophy-taking; the FBI draws a distinction between souvenirs and trophies in this regard.

Maschalismos is the practice of physically rendering the dead incapable of rising or haunting the living in undead form. 

Necrophilia is sexual attraction towards or a sexual act involving corpses

Urinate on someone's grave As a form of disrespect a person urinates on the decedent's grave
Posthumous execution is the ritual or ceremonial mutilation of an already dead body as a punishment.

See also
List of ways people honor the dead
Death and culture
Taboo

References

Death customs
Death-related lists
Cultural aspects of death